Kotosh is an archaeological site near the town of Huánuco, Peru, consisting of a series of buildings comprising six periods of continuous occupation.

Stratigraphy
Three cultural phases which preceded the Chavin culture were identified at Kotosh,

Kotosh
Wairajirca
Mito

Kotosh Period
The Kotosh Period culture stratum was situated directly beneath the Chavin culture stratum.

At this stage, maize cultivation has appeared.

Some Kotosh elements show links with the Chavin culture. For example; stirrup spouts, plain rocker stampings, and curvilinear ceramic designs. There are also similarities in black paint on red ceramics. Kotosh Black Polished Incised pottery is similar to Classical Chavin pottery.

Wairajirca Period
This is when the first pottery appeared. Wayrajirca pottery was originally found at its type site Wayrajirca, and it is also known from elsewhere in the northern highlands.

It is characterized by the polished brown and black styles decorated with incisions and post-firing paint. The designs are simple and geometric; anthropomorphic figures be added at later periods.

The Kotosh Period strongly maintained the traditions of the preceding Wairajirca Period, including the ceramic tradition.

Mito period

This was the earliest identified cultural period, which was preceramic. During this period, The Temple of the Crossed Hands was first built. The image of crossed arms is characteristic for the Kotosh temple iconography.

Some Lauricocha culture stone tools were found in this period.

See also
Andean preceramic
Kotosh Religious Tradition
Piruru

References

Bibliografía 

 Del Busto Duthurburu, José Antonio: Perú preincaico, pp. 56–58. Colección de obras escogidas de José Antonio del Busto. Lima, Empresa Editora El Comercio S.A., 2011. 
 Kauffmann Doig, Federico: Historia y arte del Perú antiguo. Vol. 1, pp. 136–138. Lima, Ediciones PEISA, 2002. 
 Kaulicke, Peter: El Perú Antiguo I. Los períodos arcaico y formativo, pp. 38. Colección Historia del Perú, editada por la Empresa Editora El Comercio S.A. Lima, 2010.

External links 
 Introduction to Kotosh site (in Spanish, includes illustrations)

Archaic period in the Americas
Archaeological sites in Peru
Archaeological sites in Huánuco Region
Former populated places in Peru
Chavin culture
Andean preceramic